The women's 800 metre freestyle event at the 2004 Olympic Games was contested at the Olympic Aquatic Centre of the Athens Olympic Sports Complex in Athens, Greece on August 19 and 20.

Japan's Ai Shibata became the first Asian swimmer to win an Olympic gold medal in long-distance freestyle swimming, outside the record time of 8:24.54. France's Laure Manaudou, who claimed the title in the 400 m freestyle, added a silver to her medal tally, with a time of 8:24.96. U.S. swimmer Diana Munz, on the other hand, edged out her teammate Kalyn Keller for the bronze medal by 0.36 of a second, clocking at 8:26.61.

Records
Prior to this competition, the existing world and Olympic records were as follows.

Results

Heats

Final

References

External links
Official Olympic Report

W
2004 in women's swimming
Women's events at the 2004 Summer Olympics